The 1889 California Golden Bears football team was an American football team that represented the University of California, Berkeley during the 1889 college football season. All scheduled games were cancelled due to excessive rains.

References

California
California Golden Bears football seasons
California Golden Bears football